William John Green (13 January 1881 – 31 January 1951) was an English professional footballer who played as a goalkeeper.

Career 
Born in Gravesend, Kent, Green began his career in non-league football with Gravesend United and Brentford before being signed by Second Division side Burnley in 1903. In five seasons with the Clarets he played 147 league games before transferring to Bradford Park Avenue at the beginning of the 1908–09 season. He spent two seasons with Bradford Park Avenue and played 31 league matches before retiring in 1910.

References

English footballers
Association football goalkeepers
Burnley F.C. players
Brentford F.C. players
Bradford (Park Avenue) A.F.C. players
English Football League players
1951 deaths
Southern Football League players
Gravesend United F.C. players
1881 births
Sportspeople from Gravesend, Kent